The Jinja–Iganga–Bugiri–Tororo Road is a road in the Eastern Region of Uganda, connecting the towns of Jinja and Tororo. Sometimes referred to as Tororo–Jinja Road, it is a busy transport corridor, connecting traffic from neighboring Kenya, and northeastern Uganda to Jinja, a major commercial and industrial center, and ultimately to Kampala, the country's capital and points beyond.

Location
The coordinates of the road at Bugiri are:0°34'21.0"N,  33°44'46.0"E (Latitude:0.572507; Longitude:33.746120).

Overview
The road is an all-weather tarmac, single carriageway road in good condition. This road is part of the Northern Corridor, a road system that connects the East African cities of Bujumbura, in Burundi, Kigali, in Rwanda and Kampala, in Uganda to Nairobi, in Kenya and ultimately to the Kenyan port of Mombasa. The road is a vital commercial link to the outside world for the three land-locked countries. It is also a vital road link to the sea, for many parts of eastern Democratic Republic of the Congo.

Points of interest
The following points of interest lie along or near the Jinja–Iganga–Bugiri–Tororo Road:

 The town of Bugembe, the headquarters of Busoga.
 The town of Kakira, the headquarters of the Madhvani Group.
 This road meets the Musita–Mayuge–Lumino–Majanji–Busia Road at Musita.
 Busoga University, in the town of Iganga.
 Iganga General Hospital in the town of Iganga
 Bugiri General Hospital in the town of Bugiri.
 The main campus of Busitema University at Busitema.
 The headquarters and factory of Tororo Cement Limited at Tororo.

See also
 List of roads in Uganda
 List of cities and towns in Uganda

References

External links
Website of Uganda National Roads Authority

Roads in Uganda
Jinja District
Mayuge District
Iganga District
Bugiri District
Busia District, Uganda
Tororo District